Amies is a surname. Notable people with the surname include:

 Hardy Amies (1909-2003), English fashion designer and founder of Hardy Amies (fashion house)
 Olive Pond Amies (1844-1917), American educator and editor
 Toby Amies (born 1967), English filmmaker and broadcaster